Vibrio tapetis is a Gram-negative, rod-shaped bacterium, the causative agent of the brown ring disease that affects cultured clams. B1090 (CECT 4600) is the type strain.

References

Further reading

Castro, Dolores, et al. Intraspecific characterization of Vibrio tapetis strains by use of pulsed-field gel electrophoresis, ribotyping, and plasmid profiling. Applied and Environmental Microbiology 63.4 (1997): 1449–1452.

External links

LPSN
Type strain of Vibrio tapetis at BacDive -  the Bacterial Diversity Metadatabase

Vibrionales
Bacteria described in 1996